Shia Jama Masjid is located at Kashmiri Gate, Delhi.

Hujjatul-Islam Syed Mohsin Ali Taqvi is its imam (prayer leader).

See also
 List of Shia mosques in NCR

References

External links
Azadari in Delhi 10th Muhramme 1431: videos, a Shia Event that Delhi will never forget, Wednesday, 30 December 2009

Mosques in Delhi
Shia mosques in India
Shia Delhi